Angadh was a Mehwas (petty princely state) under British India, spanning a part of what is now Vadodara district in Gujarat.

Angadh is the sacred place of pilgrimages on the banks of the Mahi river where Koli people gather in large numbers to see full moon in Chaitra.

History 
The non-salute state Angadh was the major one of the three Dorka states (part of the Pandu Mehwas, under the colonial Rewa Kantha Agency), the other two being Dorka itself and Reika (Reyka). It was ruled by Koli Chieftains and covered 4 1/2 square miles with a population of 2,269 in 1901, yielding a state revenue of 5,181 Rupees (1903-4; over half from land) and paying 1,344 Rupees tribute to the Gaikwar Baroda State.

During the Indian rebellion of 1857, the Angadh village was burnt down by British and Baroda State army for sheltering the Koli rebels who revolted under Bapu Gaekwad and Nihalchand Zhaveri.

References

Sources and external links 
 Imperial Gazetteer, on DSAL - Rewa Kantha

Princely states of Gujarat
Villages in Vadodara district